FC Gubkin is a Russian association football club from Gubkin, founded in 1995. It first played on the professional league level in 2006 in the Russian Second Division, where it played until 2013, when it was dissolved. Until 2003 the team was called FC Lebedinets Gubkin.

External links

Club info at 2liga.ru

Association football clubs established in 1995
Association football clubs disestablished in 2013
Defunct football clubs in Russia
Sport in Belgorod Oblast
1995 establishments in Russia